Nottingham Racecourse is a thoroughbred horse racing venue located in Nottingham, Nottinghamshire, England. It is situated at Colwick Park, close to the River Trent and about 3 km east of the city centre.

Characteristics

There are actually two courses at Nottingham, one inside the other.  They are both approximately 1 1/2 miles round and are left-handed.  The inner is used during spring and autumn, and has a 5 furlong straight, the outer is used during summer and has a 6 furlong straight.  The course generally has easy turns and minor gradients, but the home turn is fairly sharp.  Nottingham suits well-balanced horses rather than long-striding ones.

History

The racecourse was in operation ante 1773  at Nottingham Forest Recreation Ground when it was one of the earliest racecourses to be granted a Royal Plate race by the monarch.  It was run in 4 mile heats by 6 year olds carrying 12 stone.

The course moved to its present site in Colwick Park in 1892.
In 1965 the local corporation bought the 293-acre site for £500,000, and for a short time the future of the course looked in doubt.  However, the Levy Board funded improvements to the site, and the corporation agreed to lease the course to the Racecourse Holdings Trust (predecessor of Jockey Club Racecourses) for a nominal sum.

It staged both forms of racing until February 1996, after which it abandoned National Hunt racing to become a flat-only course.  The racecourse was served by its own station up until the late 1960s, when the line was shut down. There are still remnants of the station wall on what is now Colwick loop road.

The course hosts two early-season Listed races – the Kilvington Stakes for fillies over 6 furlongs and the Further Flight Stakes over 1 mile 6 furlongs, named after the horse of that name.  It also hosts the listed Nottinghamshire Oaks over 1 mile 2 furlongs in the early Summer for fillies and mares. In total, it hosted 23 race meetings in 2017, at an average of £50,467 prize money per meeting. Mr John Barnett was the courses longest serving employee; for over 25 years Mr Barnett served the course as a groundsman. On 9 June 2013, Mr Barnett's 65th birthday, he enjoyed his final raceday as a full-time employee of the racecourse, which was celebrated with a race named in his honour "Happy Retirement John Barnett handicap". The 8f race consisted of 14 runners and the winner Woody Bay trained by James Given and ridden by Graham Lee finished the race in 1m 46.78s.

Memorable events

In April 2013, there was a triple dead-heat in a race at Nottingham, only the second time it had happened for over a decade.  Horses Thorpe Bay, Majestic Manannan and My Time tied for fourth place in the Lodge Farm Stud Chris And May Mullin Handicap over 5 furlongs.

Facts and figures

Number of fixtures (2016) – 23
Prize money (2016) – £1,160,750
Top trainer (2007 – 2011 inc.) – Saeed Bin Suroor, 24 from 56 runs

Notable races

References

Bibliography

External links
Nottingham Racecourse (Official website)
Course guide on GG.COM
Course guide on At The Races

 
Horse racing venues in England
Sports venues in Nottingham
Sports venues completed in 1892
1892 establishments in England